

Births and deaths

Births
Robert Carver (composer) (c. 1485 – c. 1570)
Lady Nairn (1766–1845)
James Scott Skinner (1843–1927)
John Strachan (singer) (1875–1958)
Jimmy MacBeath (1894–1974)
Thomas Erskine, 6th Earl of Kellie (1732–81)

Collections of songs or music
 1700 "Original Scotch Tunes" by Henry Playford
 1724 "The Ever Green" by Allan Ramsay (1686–1758)
 1735 "Orpheus caledonius" by William Thomson
 1751 "The Caledonian Pocket Companion" by James Oswald
 1776 "Ancient and Modern Scottish Songs" by David Herd (1732–1810)	
 1787–1803 The Scots Musical Museum in 6 volumes by James Johnson (1753?–1811) with contributions from Robert Burns (1759–1796)
 1803 "Minstrelsy of the Scottish Border" by Sir Walter Scott (1771–1832)
 1819–1821 Jacobite Reliques in 2 volumes by James Hogg (1770–1835
 1827 "Minstrelsy Ancient and Modern" by William Motherwell (1797–1835)
 1847 "The Roxburghe Ballads"
 1875 "Kerr's Collection of Merry Melodies for the Violin" by James S Kerr
 1882 "English and Scottish Popular Ballads" by Francis James Child (1825–1896)

External links

Digitised copies from National Library of Scotland
Collection of original Scotch-tunes, (full of the highland humours) for the violin by Henry Playford, 1770.
Volume 2 of The ever green: being a collection of Scots poems, wrote by the ingenious before 1600 by Allan Ramsay, 1724.
Volumes 1 and 2 of Orpheus Caledonius, or, A collection of Scots song by William Thomson, 1733.
Caledonian pocket companion, 1747.
Volumes 1 and 2 of Ancient and modern Scottish songs, heroic ballads, etc by David Herd, 2nd edition, 1776.
Scots Musical Museum in six volumes by James Johnson, printed between 1787 and 1803.
Volumes 1 and 2 of The Relics of Jacobite Scotland by James Hogg printed between 1819 and 1821.

Scottish music